A Trumpeter (abbreviation: Tptr) is a regiment specific, descriptive name given to Privates in the British Army.  It is used for trumpeters in the Household Cavalry and was formerly used in all other cavalry regiments.

See also
Private - United Kingdom for other specific names given to Privates
Trumpet major

Cavalry
Military ranks of the British Army